Monnezzarium (pun word for Garbage) is the fifth studio album by Neapolitan singer-songwriter Tony Tammaro.

Track listing 
All tracks written and composed by Tony Tammaro

 Chat line (3:21) 
 Un'altra guerra (3:40)
 Mio marito (5:10)
 Restituiscimi il mio cuore (4:11)
 Casa Cascella (2:41)
 'O Trerrote (2:23) 
 Ballerino (3:21)
 Serenata cell (4:20) 
 Karaoke (3:18) 
 Chiatta (4:01)

1997 albums
Tony Tammaro albums